Lesia Valadzenkava or Volodenkova (born 1 May 1991) is a Belarusian ice dancer. With partner Vitali Vakunov, she is a two-time Belarusian national champion.

Programs 
(with Vakunov)

Competitive highlights 
(with Vakunov)

References

External links 

 
 Lesia Valadzenkava / Vitali Vakunov at sport-folio.net
 Lesia Valadzenkava / Vitali Vakunov at Tracings

1991 births
Belarusian female ice dancers
Living people
Figure skaters from Minsk
Competitors at the 2011 Winter Universiade